Zaurbek Azret-Aliyevich Konov (born 2 January 1985) is a Russian former professional football player.

Club career
He made his senior debut for PFC Spartak Nalchik on 20 September 2006 in a Russian Cup game against FC Sibir Novosibirsk.

Personal life
He is a twin brother of Aslanbek Konov.

External links
 
 

1985 births
Sportspeople from Nalchik
Twin sportspeople
Russian twins
Living people
Russian footballers
Association football midfielders
PFC Spartak Nalchik players
FC Angusht Nazran players